The Might That Was Assyria (1984) is a 1984 book by the Assyriologist H. W. F. Saggs, in which the author illustrates the Neo-Assyrian Empire. Saggs spent half of his life studying the ancient Assyrians, before he wrote the book.

See also

The Greatness That Was Babylon

References

1984 non-fiction books
Neo-Assyrian Empire
Books about the ancient Near East
Books by H. W. F. Saggs
English-language books
History books about Iraq